This is a list of foreign ministers of Guatemala from 1945 to the present day.

1945............ Guillermo Toriello Garrido
1945–1947: Eugenio Silva Peña
1947–1949: Enrique Muñoz Meany
1949–1951: Ismael González Arévalo
1951–1952: Manuel Francisco Galich López
1952–1954: José Raúl Osegueda Palala
1954............ Guillermo Toriello Garrido
1954–1955: Carlos Salazar Gatica
1955–1956: Domingo Goicolea Villacorta
1956............ Ricardo Quiñónez Lemus
1956–1957: Jorge Skinner-Klée
1957–1958: Adolfo Molina Orantes
1958............ Carlos García Bauer
1958–1963: Jesús Víctor Unda Murillo
1963–1966: Alberto Herrarte González
1966–1969: Emilio Arenales Catalán
1969–1970: Alberto Fuentes Mohr
1970–1972: Roberto Herrera Ibargüen
1972–1974: Jorge Arenales Catalán
1974–1978: Adolfo Molina Orantes
1978–1982: Rafael Castillo Váldez
1982............ Alfonso Alonso Lima
1982–1983: Eduardo Castillo Arriola
1983–1986: Fernando Andrade Díaz-Durán
1986–1987: Mario Rafael Quiñónez Amezquita
1987–1989: Alfonso Cabrera Hidalgo
1989............ Mario Palencia Lainfiesta
1989–1991: Ariel Rivera Irias
1991............ Álvaro Arzú
1991–1993: Gonzalo Menéndez Park
1993–1994: Arturo Fajardo Maldonado
1994–1995: Marithza Ruiz de Vielman
1995–1996: Alejandro Maldonado
1996–2000: Eduardo Stein
2000–2002: Gabriel Orellana Rojas
2002–2004: Edgar Armando Gutiérrez Girón
2004–2006: Jorge Briz Abularach
2006–2008: Gert Rosenthal
2008–2012: Haroldo Rodas
2012–2013: Harold Caballeros
2013–2014: Fernando Carrera
2014–2017: Carlos Raúl Morales
2017–2020: Sandra Jovel
2020–2022: Pedro Brolo
2022–present: Mario Búcaro

Sources
Rulers.org – Foreign ministers E–K

Foreign
Foreign Ministers
Politicians
Foreign ministers of Guatemala